The 1957-58 French Rugby Union Championship was contested by 48 clubs divided in six pools of eight.

The top five of each pool and the best two sixths (for a sum of 32 clubs) were qualified to play a play-off phase.

The championship was won by Lourdes that defeated Mazamet in the final. Le FC lourdais won the title for the third consecutive time.

Context 
The 1958 Five Nations Championship was won by Ireland, France finished 3rd,

The Challenge Yves du Manoir was won by SC Mazamet that beat Mont-de-Marsan par 3-0.

Qualification round 

In bold the clubs qualified for the next round

"Last 32" 

In bold the clubs qualified for the next round

"Last 16" 

In bold the clubs qualified for the next round

Quarter of finals 

In bold the clubs qualified for the next round

Semifinals

Final 

Jean Prat conquest his sixth and last title of French Champion.

External links
 Compte rendu finale de 1958 lnr.fr

1958
France 1958
Championship